Arthur Gore may refer to:

Baronets
Sir Arthur Gore, 1st Baronet (c. 1640–1697), Irish MP for Mayo 1661–1666
Sir Arthur Gore, 2nd Baronet (c. 1685–1741), Irish MP for Ballynakill, Donegal County and Mayo 1715–1742

Earls
Arthur Gore, 1st Earl of Arran (1703–1717), Irish MP for Donegal Borough
Arthur Gore, 2nd Earl of Arran (1734–1809), Irish MP for Wexford County
Arthur Gore, 3rd Earl of Arran (1761–1837), Irish MP for Baltimore, British MP for County Donegal
Arthur Gore, 5th Earl of Arran (1839–1901), Anglo-Irish diplomat, Lord Lieutenant of Mayo
Arthur Gore, 6th Earl of Arran (1868–1958), Anglo-Irish soldier, Lord Lieutenant of Donegal
Arthur Gore, 7th Earl of Arran (1903–1958), Anglo-Irish author
Arthur Gore, 8th Earl of Arran (1910–1983), Anglo-Irish peer
Arthur Gore, 9th Earl of Arran (born 1938), British politician

Others
Arthur Gore (cricketer) (1866–1944), New Zealand cricketer
Arthur Gore (priest) (1829–1913), Archdeacon of Macclesfield and Canon of Chester
Arthur Gore (rugby league) (1891–1969), Australian rugby league footballer
Arthur Gore (tennis) (1868–1928), British tennis player, Olympic gold medallist 1908